Alan Beards (born 19 October 1932) was an English professional footballer who played as a winger. He made over 40 appearances in the Football League playing for Bolton Wanderers, Swindon Town and Stockport County.

Playing career
Beards was born in Normanton, Yorkshire and played for Whitewood Juniors as a youth player before he began his professional football career with Bolton and he also played for Swindon Town and Stockport County and moved to Frickley Colliery in the Midland League in 1958, along with David Niven of Sheffield Wednesday.

References

External links
Official Frickley Athletic museum and hall of fame website

1932 births
Living people
English footballers
Association football forwards
Frickley Athletic F.C. players
Bolton Wanderers F.C. players
Swindon Town F.C. players
Stockport County F.C. players
English Football League players
Grantham Town F.C. players